Yngvild Ingels (born 1 January 1979) is a Belgian politician and a member of the New Flemish Alliance.

Ingels studied sociology at Ghent University and worked for the Red Cross after graduating. She was elected to the Belgian Chamber of Representatives in 2019 where she serves on the Home Affairs, Security, Migration and Administrative Affairs Committees.

References 

1979 births
Living people
Members of the Chamber of Representatives (Belgium)
New Flemish Alliance politicians
Ghent University alumni
21st-century Belgian politicians
21st-century Belgian women politicians